Yashoda is a 2022 Indian Telugu-language action thriller film written and directed by Hari–Harish. It stars Samantha in the titular role alongside Unni Mukundan, Varalaxmi Sarathkumar, and Murali Sharma.

Principal photography commenced in December 2021 and ended in July 2022. The film's score was composed by Mani Sharma, while the cinematography and editing were handled by M. Sukumar and Marthand K. Venkatesh, respectively. The film was released on 11 November 2022. Yashoda received mixed reviews from critics and was a success at the box-office.

Plot 

Yashoda, who works in Zomato, becomes a surrogate mother, as she needs to fund her sister's surgery. She is taken to Eva, a state-of-the-art surrogacy center owned by Dr. Madhubala. Yashoda befriends some of the surrogate mothers and spends time with them. All of them find out that each of them are poor, in need of money.

Meanwhile, the local police investigate the accident of business tycoon, Shiva Reddy, and his girlfriend, Aarushi. They deduce that it was a pre-planned murder, and the police appoint Vasudeva IPS to lead the investigation. He learns that Aarushi was a model and checks her e-mails, mail, and text messages. He learns that Aarushi was advised by her friend to not promote a specific cosmetic brand, as it contains harmful chemicals that are unknown to scientists. Vasudeva and his team head to meet Aarushi's friend, but find that he was murdered two days ago. Vasudeva retrieves a cosmetic sample from his house, and finds a connection with the death of Olivia, a deceased Hollywood actress, who was killed when she drank a drugged juice. When he checks into the owner of the cosmetic brand, he finds that the Central Minister, Giridhar, owns the patent.

After an attack by unknown men, Vasudeva learns that 122 models will be arriving in India, in six months. He learns that one model, Elena, has already arrived. Vasudev along with his team, and Police commissioner Balram, follow her to a forest, but they are caught by the local tribals. Yashoda becomes suspicious of Eva, as she finds that her friends, Kajal and Leela, went missing after suffering from labor pains and undergoing a surgery. To her shock, she learns that Eva is not situated in the city, but was actually shown to the surrogate mothers using a live-projector. Yashoda later sneaks into Zone-2, where she fights with Jenny, a fellow surrogate, who is faking her pregnancy and is a member of Eva faculty. She tries to kill Yashoda, but Yashoda manages to kill her. Afterwards, Yashoda finds many boxes containing dead children and surrogate mothers in the assets room, in which she finds Kajal and Leela's bodies.

Yashoda is then caught by the security under the commands of Madhubala. When the security tries to rape her she fights against him and kills him too. She then tries to enter Madhubala’s cabin using Dr. Gautham’s badge to find more about Eva but is caught by Madhubala. Madhubala reveals that she was suffering from a disease, which resulted in her losing her beauty and causes aging, but Gautham helped her by developing a drug which cured her illness. However, the drug is only a temporary solution, with its effects lasting only six months. Giridhar, who turns out to be Madhubala's husband, tells her to invent a new drug, by funding her research. Cut to the present, Madhubala and Gautham hold a meeting with their investors, while showing the live-footage of the meeting, to Yashoda, who is being held captive in a separate room. The duo reveals that the plasma in the fetus is the secret ingredient used for the invention of the drug, and they hire poor women to become surrogate mothers, by paying them. After inducing fake labor pains and performing C-Section they remove the fetus, discreetly kill the women, and retrieve the plasma.

They finally created the drug and sold it to rich women, mostly models, CEOs and actresses. They also reveal that Olivia had died due to a drug–drug interaction. They had Aarushi and Shiva Reddy killed in the accident, as she learnt that the cosmetic brand also contained the same drug, and threatened them of leaking it. In the forest, Vasudeva and his team learn that Balram is in cahoots with Madhubala and Gautham. Vasudeva and his team are brought to a den, to have them killed. At Eva, Yashoda finds that the facility is situated in a forest, and manages to escape through the emergency exit, but is knocked by Gautham, who brings her back. Gautham makes a video call to Balram, who is holding Vasudeva and his team, at gunpoint. However, Gautham, in-turn, is held at gunpoint by Yashoda. It is revealed that Yashoda is actually a skilled IPS trainee, undercover at Eva. Despite being the academy topper, she was forced to arrange money, to join the police force.

One day, Yashoda learns about her sister, Brinda's disappearance, and finds that she had become a surrogate mother to arrange the money for her and was taken to Eva. In order to find her, Yashoda became a surrogate mother and planned everything from the start. A fight ensues, where Yashoda defeats the goons and Gautham, but gets hit in the stomach, resulting in the death of her unborn baby. Meanwhile, Vasudeva and his team defeat the tribals and kill Balram. Yashoda meets up with her fellow surrogates and asks about Brinda but does not get any information about her.

Madhubala tries to escape in a helicopter, but Yashoda manages to stop her. Madhubala reveals that she was also pregnant, but sacrificed her fetus by aborting it to improve and develop her beauty and research. The women get enraged upon learning about Madhubala's true face and her activities, and push her off the cliff, killing her. Gautham tries to escape, but gets caught by Vasudeva and his team. Yashoda finds Brinda, who is in labor pain. The women assist Yashoda in delivering Brinda's child. Afterwards, Giridhar's involvement too in the scandal is exposed, and he is arrested.

Cast 

Samantha as Yashoda
Unni Mukundan as Dr. Gautham
Varalaxmi Sarathkumar as Madhubala
Rao Ramesh as Central Minister Giridhar
Murali Sharma as police commissioner Balram
Sampath Raj as Vasudeva IPS
 Rajiv Kumar Aneja as External affairs minister
Shatru as Police Investigation Officer Rishi IPS
Madhurima as Care taker Sudhamma
Divya Sripada as Leela
Kalpika Ganesh as Teju
Priyanka Sharma as Kaajal
Preethi Asrani as Brinda

Production

Development
Actress Samantha signed a Telugu-Tamil bilingual film in October 2021, directed by the duo Hari Shankar and Harish Narayan under the production of Sridevi Movies. The film's title was announced as Yashoda in December 2021. After discussing with executive producer Senthil, the film was made only in Telugu.

Filming
With cinematography and editing by M. Sukumar and Marthand K. Venkatesh, respectively, principal photography began in December 2021. Hollywood stuntman Yannick Ben was brought in to train and choreograph stunts for Samantha.

After shooting for 100 days, filming was completed by July 2022, except for one song. CGI work and post-production works began subsequently.

Music

Release

Theatrical
Yashoda was initially scheduled to release on 12 August 2022, coinciding with Independence Day and Raksha Bandhan. It was postponed due to delay in filming. On 17 October 2022, the new release date was announced as 11 November 2022 where the film will be released in Telugu in addition to dubbed versions of Tamil, Hindi, Kannada and Malayalam languages.

The film made a pre-release business of ₹55 crore, including theatrical and digital streaming rights, which were sold at a cost of ₹11.50 crore and ₹20 crore respectively.

Home media
The film was premiered on Amazon Prime Video on 9 December 2022 in Telugu along with dubbed versions of Tamil, Hindi, Kannada and Malayalam languages. The Telugu version was premiered on television on 5 February 2023 on ETV.

Reception
Yashoda received mixed reviews from critics and audience. Neeshitha Nyayapathi of The Times of India rated the film 3.5 out of 5 stars and wrote "Yashoda is the film to catch this weekend if you're looking for something beyond the usual masala fare or love stories." Priyanka Sundar of Firstpost rated the film 2.75 out of 5 stars and wrote "Samantha is brilliant in Yashoda that falters in effectively landing its shocking twists and turns". Manoj Kumar R of The Indian Express rated the film 2 out of 5 and wrote "Film's grindhouse treatment negates the impact of Samantha's performance which has a lot of conviction". Sowmya Rajendran of The News Minute rated the film 2.5 out of 5 stars and wrote "Yashoda has quite a few loose ends as it draws to a close, leaving the viewer dissatisfied". 

Sudhir Srinivasan of Cinema Express rated the film 2.5 out of 5 stars and wrote "Fascinating ideas don't translate into exciting storytelling in this Samantha-led actioner". Sangeetha Dundoo of The Hindu wrote "But despite the missteps, it manages to be engaging." Arvind V of Pinkvilla rated the film 
2.5 out of 5 and wrote "Mollywood actor Unni Mukundan is likely to become a sought-after name in Telugu cinema after this." Haricharan Pudipeddi of Hindustan Times wrote "The production design deserves a special mention since most of the story unfolds inside a large facility and the setwork is commendable." Janani K of India Today wrote "Yashoda could have been much better had the director duo concentrated on not stating the obvious." 

Shrishti Negi of News18 gave 3 out of 5 stars and wrote "Yashoda requires patience and attention. Once you get through the first half, the film holds your complete attention, making it worthy of your time." A critic for India Herald wrote "Overall, the movie is at most mediocre. Samantha distinguishes out because she effortlessly handled a dual-shaded character. Excellent production values. The other casting is also excellent."

References

External links 
 
 Yashoda at Bollywood Hungama
Films shot in Hyderabad, India
Indian action thriller films
Films set in Hyderabad, India
2022 action thriller films
2020s Telugu-language films
2022 films
Films scored by Mani Sharma
Films about surrogacy
Films about health care